Diplophos orientalis is a species of fish in the family Gonostomatidae.

References 

Animals described in 1940
Gonostomatidae